Labora Farms was founded as a project with the help of the Northern Ugandan Social Action Fund (NUSAF), a government organization in Uganda with $100 million of funding from the World Bank. The goal of NUSAF is to help local communities in the 18 districts of northern Uganda that have been ravaged by conflict over the last 20 years. This money is given directly to members of the community so they can invest in infrastructure and training for long-term development.

Labora Farms is unique in NUSAF as it was the first project started and run entirely by former members of the Lord’s Resistance Army (LRA), a rebel group responsible for numerous war crimes over the last 23 years in northern Uganda.

While all of the members had either gone through the customary cleansing rituals by their communities or were currently going through them, because of its ties to former enemy combatants, Labora Farms received a very negative reception in the international community. Within the local people and government though there was a lot of support.

Today Labora Farms is still receiving mixed praise from all sides, though it has had success in helping former LRA members not only make a living wage, but also for helping them reintegrate into their communities. Using historical newspaper articles and first hand interviews, this article looks at the history of Labora Farms since its controversial inception.

This article is organized as follows. The first section is a description of the history of the difficult and protracted conflict in northern Uganda and the effects it has had on the people. Section 3 describes the unique way the Acholi people have of accepting former enemy combatants back into their culture. Section 4 discusses the initial phase of implementation of the Labora Farms project along with the local and international reaction to it. Section 5 discusses the redistribution of land within the farm, why this turned out to be successful, and what the local and international communities are saying about Labora Farms today. Section 6 then discusses some of the future challenges of the project.

Northern Uganda conflict

Northern Uganda has seen some of the most complex and difficult violence in Africa. From 1994 until 2007 the LRA rebel group abducted approximately 60,000 youth aged primarily 5 to 30 years old to be used in their resistance movement. These youth were often used for short periods of time doing menial tasks such as giving simple directions and carrying supplies.

Many of the youth though were used as fighters and sex slaves for the soldiers and were forced to participate in violence against others. Approximately 28% of the males abducted were forced to murder a civilian, with 8% forced to murder a family member. Even among those that were never abducted, 37% of youth males witnessed a killing.

In addition to the violence most youth experienced, everyone was affected by the government’s strategy to fight the resistance group. To isolate the fighters, the government forcefully took all of the people in the north from their villages and placed them into internally displaced persons (IDP) camps. The people in the camps had no jobs as they were all trained previously as farmers. They were suddenly without land, with poor access to water, sanitation and health care.

In 2007 a serious peace process began, spurred in part by international pressure, impending International Criminal Court (ICC) proceedings on the leaders of the LRA and decreasing support from southern Sudan where the rebels were hiding. With the peace has come a return to the villages for the people, but the return is slow in part because of worries of insecurity and concerns for crop harvests.

Acholi cleansing and forgiveness

The Acholi people practice a unique system of forgiveness. If a person is truly seeking to be forgiven for past indiscretions, no matter how severe they are, they may begin a process of forgiveness, called mato oput, meaning literally “to drink from the tree”. This process is takes time and culminates in a ceremony where the offending and offended parties drink the waters of a local tree together. Alternatively, a ceremony can be performed where the offender steps on an egg, symbolizing a return to innocence, and then steps over a line, where they are then accepted back into the community. The acceptance is so complete that, after the ceremony, if anyone in the community accuses the person of wrongdoing, it is the accuser that will be tried for offending the community.

The Acholi system of justice is complex and often more violent than this forgiveness ceremony would suggest. People caught committing a crime, such as stealing or murder, often face mob justice and usually end up dead if the police do not arrive fast enough. While this seems like a contradiction from the above description, it is consistent within the community because what really matters is that the offender must ask for forgiveness of their own volition, and not be induced to do so by a fear for their life. Only if the community is satisfied that the offense will never be committed again is the person allowed to ask for mato oput.

This system of forgiveness has created a problem within the international community with the recent ICC indictments against the leaders of the LRA. These indictments have met with widespread disapproval from the Acholi people. Many, including local citizens that have faced displacement from the conflict, would prefer the leaders of the LRA instead go through the cleansing ritual and return to their respective communities. Most others would prefer the leaders go through the cleansing ritual, but instead of moving back to the communities find a home in another country. Only a very few support any kind of potential jail sentence for the leaders, given that they ask for forgiveness.

This is of course counter to the basic idea of the ICC, which seeks in part to offer a threat to those that are thinking about committing future crimes. When this point was expressed to Ray, a former LRA captain, his response was “When did war begin? When will war end?” Meaning the idea that war can be prevented by making it costly in an abstract sense for people is not going to work.

Individual Story: Captain Ray

Ray was with the LRA for 18 years and attained the rank of captain before escaping. He was originally abducted while drunk and since returning has not had any alcohol; in his words, “I will die without another drink”.

Like many abductees, after time Ray was given more and more responsibility, eventually moving up the ranks. During his time with the LRA he killed many people, but has since denounced violence. He has gone through the forgiveness ritual and has been accepted back into his community.

When he first returned to his community he began a weekly radio address to his former friends in the LRA, telling them about his experiences coming home and asking them to return. Some of those that did return are also working on Labora Farms and have also been able to perform the cleansing rituals.

He still faces danger from the LRA though because of his calls for former rebels to return home. He now believes though that “putting your life in danger for peace is not a bad thing”.

Initial phase and responses

Labora Farms was begun in … at the request of …

There were two main goals for the project initially. The first, and perhaps most important goal, was to offer former LRA members something to do with their time rather than being idle and perhaps likely to cause more problems. In addition, the farm offered a secure place, both financially and physically, for people returning from the rebels, which helped with enticing people to leave the bush.

An initial unintended consequence of the project was that it increased local labor demand. Because of the size and complexity of the farm, the project community found it necessary to go to the local community to find additional workers. This had the effect of increasing the wealth of the local people. A new community has since arisen in the area composed of as many as 500 people to work on the farm.

Formally the farm was organized as a community based project and was not meant to have any formal hierarchical structure. Initial concerns in the international community about the farm were focused on the fact that, since it was run by a former general in the LRA and staffed entirely by former LRA members, the farm did in fact display a hierarchical structure similar to the command structure the members experience while rebels. This led to such groups as the [Victims Rights Working Group] (VRWG) to express concerns over the fact that the “senior amnestied LRA commanders are in charge [at Labora Farms] and exploit the very women and girls whom they abducted, raped and held in captivity”. The national Ugandan newspapers published a number of attacks against the farm, most with quotes exclusively from NGOs. The local response though was quite different.

Since all of the people at Labora had either gone through the cleansing rituals or were in the process of going through the rituals, the local people and government were very supportive of the program. [government help]

Redistribution and current responses

There are differing opinions on the success of Labora Farms. One positive outcome was that it was able to bring the former LRA members back into the community fully through a gradual process. As a first step, it offered a secure setting where people could make a small living. This helped in enticing people to leave the bush and lead to an informal hierarchical structure that kept people in the same position they held in the bush, but without the weapons. This means the farm in fact acted as a transition mechanism from conflict to peace.

The next step in the process is that after … years, the mission of Labora Farms shifted from a community system to an individual one. In … the land was divided among the individuals [was this equal?], which had the consequence of entirely breaking down the hierarchical structure of the farm. Private ownership of resources had the effect of breaking the military structure as people were no longer responsible to a boss or a community system with its informal hierarchy.

Individual Story: Keenera

Keenera was with the LRA for 5 years before escaping. His choice to leave came in part because of the radio address of Captain Ray. Leaving the LRA though is not an easy thing to do. In his words, “if you want to die immediately, you ask to leave”. As he had been with the rebels for a while, he was trusted to go out for short periods of time. During one of his trips he headed for the town and has not looked back.

Initially his return was very difficult. “Those that had children who were abducted understood, while those that did not would point their finger in my face”. Today though he has been accepted back into his community and has his own plot of land to farm. While he is very poor, he is proud to be working on his own without fear of violence.

Lessons learned

Labora Farms today is still going strong, though it is not without problems. One criticism of the project is the effect on the women associated with the former LRA members.

Image gallery from the farm

References 

Composed in part of individual interviews of Ray and Keenera, along with Ambrose, the NUSAF coordinator who helped to organize the project.

External links

AcholiNet.com Northern Uganda News and Related Material (site defunct; accessible only via Archive.org )
 Annan, Blattman and Horton 2006, "The State of Youth and Youth Protection in Northern Uganda: Findings from the Survey for War-Affected Youth, A Report for UNICEF Uganda", 2006
 Peter Amico's Thoughts (blog)
 Survey of War Affected Youth (SWAY)
 UgandaGenocide.info

Non-profit organisations based in Uganda
Agriculture in Uganda
Labour in Uganda